Paul Ernst may refer to:

 Paul Ernst (biathlete) (born 1935), Austrian Olympic biathlete
 Paul Ernst (German writer) (1866–1933)
 Paul Ernst (American writer) (1899–1985), pulp fiction writer

See also
 Paul Ernest, philosopher of mathematics